The Automatt was a sound recording studio in San Francisco, California, promoted for its early mix automation system. During its eight active years, 1976 to 1984, it was one of the top recording studios in the region. The Automatt was founded by producer David Rubinson and opened in an existing studio subleased from Columbia Records, who continued to record in the same building for a few years; thus it was sometimes referred to as CBS/Automatt. Rubinson leased the whole building in 1978 and from that point, operated three rooms for recording and mixing, a mastering room, a rehearsal room, and offices. The studio complex was known for its top-notch equipment, for the hit records it produced, and for the famous artists who recorded there. Under Rubinson and chief engineer Fred Catero it served as the training ground for respected recording engineers such as Leslie Ann Jones and producers such as Scott Mathews.

Background

Coast Recorders
The first recording studio built at 827 Folsom Street in San Francisco was a built-new location for Coast Recorders, one of many recording studios Bill Putnam operated in U.S. cities. Putnam leased the Folsom location from its aging owner, John Vitlin, a Russian immigrant who co-founded Global Merchandising, an import/export company in San Francisco. To replace an obsolescent building housing Coast Recorders on Bush Street, Putnam designed a two-floor studio complex containing all the necessary record company elements under one roof: three recording and mixing rooms, a mastering room with a disc cutting lathe, a high-speed tape duplication room, and office space for label and studio management. Unusually, five echo sends were available for use throughout the facility, two of them stereo echo chambers normaled (connected by default) to the main two studios. Francis Ford Coppola leased space on the second floor for his American Zoetrope film studio. The first session was taped on June 23, 1969, in Studio B, and the grand opening was held later that November. Less than a year later, on September 15, 1970, Putnam sold majority control of the building to Columbia Records, a division of CBS.

Columbia Studios San Francisco
Columbia Records under Clive Davis wished to cater to San Francisco artists who were less willing to travel to Los Angeles or New York to make records. Davis hoped that the new location would be more open to musician creativity and less constricted by union rules. Columbia assumed operation of Coast's Studios A and B, bringing in Roy Halee—known for experimental recording techniques that conflicted with union rules—from New York as chief engineer. Roy Segal, also from Columbia New York, was enlisted to engineer and to manage the facility, and A&R-man and producer George Daly developed performing artists. Engineer Glen Kolotkin joined from Los Angeles, and San Francisco-based George Horn also joined as mastering engineer, working out of Studio D with its Westrex disc cutting lathe, under lease from Coast. Coast Recorders continued in business, working out of Studio C, fitted for quadraphonic projects.

Columbia found it difficult to attract San Francisco artists who were instead booking time at Wally Heider Studios because of its casual vibe and its string of hits. Fred Catero, a successful engineer and New York native, doubted the wisdom of by-the-book Columbia operating in the laid-back atmosphere present in the Bay Area. Years later, he said, "Columbia was a very conservative company ... It was all-union and everything was done by the clock. There were very strict rules about how long sessions could go and, of course, about drugs and things like that." The first album recorded at Columbia in San Francisco was the fourth album for New York-based Blood, Sweat & Tears, produced and engineered by Halee. Subsequently, New Yorker Paul Simon flew out to record his first U.S. solo album which sold over a million copies. Segal was more successful bringing in Bay Area artists; he recorded Big Brother & the Holding Company, Sons of Champlin, and Sly & the Family Stone.

Tasked with both studio maintenance and record mastering, George Horn brought in Phil Brown to help. For a few years, Columbia owned the only stereo lacquer mastering equipment in San Francisco, and it was kept busy. Paul Stubblebine joined Columbia's San Francisco recording studio in 1973 as an intern, later advancing to second engineer, then mastering engineer under Horn. Between the three of them, Horn, Brown and Stubblebine operated the mastering suite day and night.

The studio recorded and mixed works by Columbia artists and also by non-Columbia producers and artists such as the Grateful Dead, who recorded Grateful Dead from the Mars Hotel; a 1974 release that was named after a rundown residential hotel a block and a half away on 4th Street.

David Rubinson
David Rubinson worked as a producer for Columbia Records until settling in the San Francisco Bay Area in 1969. He encouraged his favorite Columbia engineer Fred Catero to leave his job—and a newly completed home in New York—to bring his family to the West Coast and to partner with him on recording projects. The two intended to open a recording studio with rock promoter Bill Graham and entertainment attorney Brian Rohan, but the resulting umbrella organization The Fillmore Corporation with its two record companies, Fillmore Records and San Francisco Records, instead booked artists at Pacific Recorders in San Mateo, California; the only 16-track studio in the area at the time. Rubinson and Catero made several hit recordings there over the next five years, at first for The Fillmore Corporation and then after it folded in 1971, for Rubinson's own promotion company: David Rubinson & Friends. In 1973 after repeated bad experiences with the studio owner, Rubinson severed relations with Pacific Recorders. Instead, he paid a discount price in advance for 3,000 hours of studio time at Wally Heider's Studio A, to be used at night and on weekends. Rubinson asked Heider to install a four-channel musicians' headphones monitoring system, and an automation system for the mixing console, but Heider refused.

Frustrated first with Pacific and then with Heider, and enticed by Columbia's new 16-track studio, Rubinson began bringing his artists to Columbia Studios in the early 1970s. He moved his operations to offices on the second floor, above the recording studios; his own large office was formerly used by Coppola. Frustrated with traveling between recording sessions in Los Angeles and San Francisco, Rubinson sought to record at a single San Francisco studio that he could use as he saw fit. He made an offer to CBS to take over Columbia's Studio C, paying an annual lease on the space to Vitlin's son and heir, attorney Victor Vitlin. CBS would supply the infrastructure, the microphones, and studio maintenance and reception services. Rubinson also leased a rehearsal room on the second floor which once housed Coppola's film studio. To differentiate his business, Rubinson decided to install a new mixing console as well as multitrack recording equipment. Catero would be the chief engineer for the new room. In late 1976, Rubinson and CBS signed the deal and Rubinson began bringing clients to the studio, which he named "the Automatt," as a play on New York's old-style coin-operated food vending restaurants called "automats", and because the studio's new mixing console was equipped with an advanced new feature: the first practical recording studio automation system in San Francisco. The mixer that Rubinson had bought was a Harrison 4032 mixing console with programmable mute keys, and he had a Michael Larner-assembled Allison Research Memory-Plus Automation System based on the Zilog Z80 microprocessor. The Allison system was capable of handling 40 microphone inputs mixing down to 32 tracks on tape, and it could store 65,536 separate functions. Larner also assembled for Rubinson an interface called Autopunch which automated the controls of the MCI 24-track tape machine. As well, the Automatt offered a 4-track monitor system for the musicians, a revolutionary development which gave each performer greater freedom to optimize his or her own headphones mix. The studio monitors were Big Reds, popular boxes based on the Altec Lansing Duplex 604 coaxial speaker, powered by McIntosh MC75 tube monoblock amplifiers.

History

1976–1978
The first session that Rubinson brought to the Automatt was Heartsfield, a vocal rock group that recorded their album Collector's Item in late 1976. In December, Rubinson produced remote recordings made by Santana in Europe, and when Santana returned home they came to the Automatt to record new tracks and mix the album Moonflower—a combination of concert and studio work. In March 1977 the Meters, a band who had never before recorded outside of New Orleans, laid down tracks for their album New Directions. Immediately following, Patti LaBelle booked the studio and rehearsal space. She practiced 40 songs written by herself, Rubinson, and his A&R man Jeffrey Cohen, narrowing the selections down to 9 for her first solo album, Patti LaBelle. Musicians on the project included pianist Bud Ellison who was also musical director, drummer James Gadson, guitarist Ray Parker Jr., and two members of the Meters who stayed to help: bassist George Porter Jr. and guitarist Leo Nocentelli.

Competing with the Automatt in San Francisco was the studio Different Fur, also boasting a Harrison console with Allison Research automation. In March 1977, owner Patrick Gleeson said, "David Rubinson may have the most advanced studio west of Market Street, but we have the most advanced east of Market." Gleeson, an expert programmer and player of synthesizers, took part in the scoring of the film Apocalypse Now, his synth parts blended into the whole soundtrack at the Automatt in 1979, engineered by Leslie Ann Jones in Dolby Stereo 70 mm Six Track. Using Studio D, CBS recording studio worked with Rubinson to master his mixes for release. CBS mastering engineer George Horn fine-tuned songs by Rubinson clients Phoebe Snow, Santana and Patti LaBelle.

Bassist Ron Carter recorded his album Third Plane at the Automatt in July 1977, with Tony Williams on drums and Herbie Hancock on keyboards. The Automatt was given a project by Hancock later that summer: mix the live album VSOP: The Quintet, to be assembled from two live performances, one indoors in San Diego and one outdoors in Berkeley. The group (composed of four members of the 1964-1969 Miles Davis Quintet with Freddie Hubbard on trumpet) was signed to Columbia, but the mixing process was difficult because of the two different acoustic performance spaces, and the Automatt was chosen for the task. The automated mixing equipment proved its value when Hancock visited to approve the final mix. Hancock was displeased with the level of artificial reverberation applied to the piano per his earlier instruction—he wanted to change how much EMT plate reverb was in the mix. However, a different artist was at that time booked in the studio mixing an album. Rather than zeroing out the Harrison console's settings and losing headway on the other project, Catero was able to save the current settings, then recall the earlier VSOP session settings on the Allison automation, make a minor adjustment to the level of EMT reverb, and re-mix the album in less than two hours.

At the Automatt's grand opening party in early 1978, Clive Davis and Roy Segal listened to the VSOP master tapes, and an array of well-known San Francisco Bay Area artists, engineers and producers attended. Rubinson and Davis toasted the success of the studio with glasses of wine from Rubinson's cellar, but the next day CBS announced they were closing the whole building because of financial difficulties. Segal locked the doors. The union engineers at CBS initiated a strike to recoup their pay. Even though the Automatt was not a union house, CBS was, and the Automatt's doors remained locked until the strike was resolved.

Prompted by this setback, Rubinson arranged with master lease holder Putnam to sublease the whole building, and re-opened in 1978 with three studios in operation. Rubinson distributed his collection of vintage Wurlitzer jukeboxes throughout the facility.

Bandleader Spike Jones' daughter Leslie Ann Jones came on board in 1978 as engineer under Catero. Rubinson told her that Catero was the only engineer, so he did not know whether she would be assistant engineer or first engineer. She said later, "I thought, 'Well, all it's going to take is one person calling that doesn't have their own engineer and I'll be it.' And that's exactly what happened." Jones soon picked up first engineer assignments, and later co-produced some recordings, beginning with Holly Near's Speed of Light (co-produced with Evie Sands).

The organization became known for having the finest equipment run by expert engineers led by Catero and Jones. Mastering engineer Paul Stubblebine stayed on at the studio, changing employers from CBS to Rubinson. Other gold- and platinum-level engineers who polished their craft at the Automatt include Jim Gaines, Maureen Droney, Ken Kessie, David Frazer, Michael Rosen and John Nowland. Jones said that, at one time when the studio had six engineers on staff, "three of them were women"; no other major recording studio could boast such feminist equality at the time. She said, "the funny thing is, I don't think that David [Rubinson] even really thought about that. You see, the integrity and vibe came from the top down." Three of the studio's managers were women: Susan Skaggs, Janice Lee and Michele Zarin. All three went on to manage or operate other recording studios.

For three weeks in September and October 1978, singer Joe Strummer and guitarist Mick Jones of the Clash appeared at the Automatt to record overdubs for the album Give 'Em Enough Rope. Flying in from the UK, Jones and Strummer stayed at the Holiday Inn in Chinatown, and nearly every night they listened to punk bands play at the Mabuhay Gardens, known in the punk scene as "the Mab". They saw their acquaintance Nick Lowe and met his girlfriend Carlene Carter (the step-daughter of one of their musical heroes: Johnny Cash) after seeing her sing. Between takes at the Automatt, Strummer and Jones listened for the first time to the Bobby Fuller Four version of "I Fought the Law" on one of Rubinson's jukeboxes, and when they returned to England they re-made the song into a Clash standard.

On October 1, 1978, the band Journey performed at the Automatt with guest artists, broadcast nationwide as "Journey & Friends" on the King Biscuit Flower Hour radio program. The "Friends" consisted of the Tower of Power horn section, vocalists Jo Baker and Annie Sampson from Stoneground, and guitarist/vocalist Tom Johnston of the Doobie Brothers.

1979–1980s
Independent label 415 Records was founded in San Francisco in 1978, and from the beginning Rubinson was supportive of the organization. David Kahne, A&R director and staff producer for 415, operated out of a small upstairs office at the Automatt, signing and recording bands such as Translator and Wire Train. Punk bands were given a discount rate at the studio, often recording at night and on weekends.  By 1982, Kahne was also producing and engineering Rank and File for Slash Records. In 1983, Daniel Levitin joined 415 Records, producing an album for the Afflicted. The next year he replaced Kahne, and recorded a series of little-known bands such as the Big Race for 415. Levitin befriended veteran producer Sandy Pearlman who sometimes worked at the Automatt, and years later Pearlman accepted the position of president of 415 Records. In the mid-1980s the two men drove to Stanford University to audit classes about brain function and neuropsychology, especially ones given by Karl H. Pribram. This was the start of Levitin's doctoral studies in that field, researching how the brain works when making music.

Journey returned to the Automatt in November 1979 with 19 new songs, and recorded them "live" in the studio, the musicians playing together at the same time. Producers Geoff Workman and Kevin Elson, both former recording engineers, helped the band trim the collection down to 11 for the album Departure. Released in March the next year, the album went to #8 on Billboard's album charts.

In February 1982 at age 39, Rubinson suffered a heart attack. Rather than return to work and aggravate his nerves, he stopped producing bands. He brought in Michelle Zarin to replace Michelle Meisner as studio manager. Zarin came to the Automatt from the role of general manager at the Record Plant in Sausalito. Meisner moved back to engineering, adding mastering to her list of skills. In May, Rubinson underwent quadruple bypass surgery. Regarding Zarin, Rubinson said, "She was a gift ... She took over the studio and treated it like it was her own. Everybody loved her; she was phenomenal."

In her office, Zarin held Friday afternoon wine-and-cheese parties with producers, artists and engineers who had worked at the Automatt during the week. This regular get-together became something of a local in-scene fixture, with famous artists and producers meeting each other and sharing ideas. In 1984 after he came on board with 415 Records, Levitin was invited by Zarin to attend his first Friday office party. Levitin said he was anxious to meet Ron Nevison, engineer of Quadrophenia for the Who who was working at the Automatt for Jefferson Starship, but Levitin violated an unstated protocol and introduced himself to Nevison. Levitin said Nevison shook his hand but then turned away and continued his conversation with others, and never spoke to Levitin again. Zarin later told Levitin that, had he waited for her to make the introduction, the meeting would have been more rewarding.

Pearlman returned to the Automatt in 1983 to oversee an album by Blue Öyster Cult. He stayed on and subleased Studio C from Rubinson, calling it Time Enough & World Enough Studios. There, he recorded Dream Syndicate's Medicine Show album in 1984, and kept the room busy with smaller projects, including mixes by disc jockey François Kevorkian. From 1980, Narada Michael Walden booked a great deal of time at the studio, completing the transition from being a successful drummer to producing artists, composing music and drumming. Walden's first producer credit was for Sister Sledge, and he attracted further female vocalist clients, producing Angela Bofill, Patti Austin, Phyllis Hyman, Margie Joseph, Stacy Lattisaw, Aretha Franklin and Whitney Houston. In 1983, Walden brought 20-year-old Tori Amos to the studio to record some demos, but Amos did not like the dance-pop stylings Walden applied to her voice, and she did not pursue the connection. Assistant engineer Ken Kessie noted that Walden worked very quickly in the studio with an expert group of backing musicians, and when one take was finished Kessie barely had enough time to put a label and leader on the reel of tape before Walden was calling to start the next recording.

In October 1984, Aretha Franklin worked on part of her album Who's Zoomin' Who? at the Automatt. Walden supervised the session, with David Frazer engineering. The song "Freeway of Love" was the result, later a Grammy-winning hit. Next, Walden brought Whitney Houston to the Automatt to record "How Will I Know", in the process helping to create one of three chart-topping hits from her debut album.

When property owner Vitlin informed Rubinson that he was going to increase the price of the lease by 400%, Rubinson disagreed with him. Rubinson felt that his business was barely staying alive, and that there was no pressure from the marketplace from other tenants interested in occupying the building. Rubinson pointed out that Vitlin would have to spend about a million dollars to turn the building into something else such as apartments. Vitlin insisted on the increased lease, but Rubinson refused. Instead, Rubinson paid the previously agreed amount into an escrow account.

The final blow to the business came from increased competition. Fantasy Studios had expanded their operation in Berkeley, with Segal as manager. Segal pursued former clients of the Automatt, and convinced Santana, a long-term Rubinson artist, to record at Fantasy, though they were booked for three months at the Automatt. In 1984 one week before they were to load in, Santana called the Automatt to cancel their booking, and Rubinson decided to quit. Projects in progress would have to be completed elsewhere. Pearlman took his projects to Harbor Sound in Sausalito, Walden opened his own Tarpan Studios taking over the old Tres Virgos studio in San Rafael, and other projects were completed at the Plant and Studio D (both in Sausalito), or at Fantasy.

The building remained largely vacant for five years. Right after the Automatt closed, Walden bought the Trident TSM mixing console which had been in Studio A. Levitin remembers a few odd recordings being initiated in 1985 after the Automatt supposedly shut down. In 1986, Rubinson removed the Trident TSM from Studio B and sold it to Joel Jaffe and Dan Godfrey, the owners of Studio D in Sausalito. Vitlin tried to sell the building but found no buyers. He sued the building's former tenants for making structural changes without permission: Bill Putnam, Coast Recorders, American Zoetrope, Francis Ford Coppola, the Automatt and David Rubinson. Various insurance companies paid Vitlin a settlement, and he collected Rubinson's escrow account holding the earlier, lower lease payments. Left abandoned, squatters broke into the building and occasionally lived in it. When the 1989 Loma Prieta earthquake hit, the building suffered severe structural damage. It was demolished to make a parking lot. Later, new condominiums were erected on the spot, part of a larger redevelopment project for the South of Market (SoMa) area.

Artists in the studio
A month designation of "00" indicates month unknown.

References
Notes

Bibliography

Companies based in San Francisco
Mass media companies established in 1976
Mass media companies disestablished in 1984
Music of the San Francisco Bay Area
Privately held companies based in California
Recording studios in California
1976 establishments in California
1984 disestablishments in California